Lejeunea is a genus of leafy liverworts in the Lejeuneaceae family. The GBIF lists up to 592 species (as of October 2022), along with a worldwide distribution.

The genus was circumscribed by Marie-Anne Libert in Ann. Gen. Sci. Phys. vol.6 on page 372 in 1820.

The genus name of Lejeunea is in honour of Alexandre Louis Simon Lejeune (1779–1858), who was a Belgian physician and botanist.

Selected species 
 Lejeunea cavifolia (Ehrh.) Lindb.
 Lejeunea flava (Sw.) Nees
 Lejeunea hodgsoniana
 Lejeunea sordida - Sri Lanka

See List of Lejeunea species

References 

Porellales genera
Lejeuneaceae